The 1966 New Mexico gubernatorial election took place on November 8, 1966, in order to elect the Governor of New Mexico. Due to term limits, incumbent Democrat Jack M. Campbell could not run for reelection to a third term.

Democratic primary
The Democratic primary was won by former state senator Gene Lusk.

Results

Republican primary
The Republican primary was won by state representative David Cargo.

Results

General election

Results

References

1966
gubernatorial
New Mexico
November 1966 events in the United States